Angionychus lividus is a species of beetle in the family Carabidae, the only species in the genus Angionychus.

References

Harpalinae